McLaren Racing Limited is a British motor racing team based at the McLaren Technology Centre in Woking, Surrey, England. McLaren is best known as a Formula One constructor, the second oldest active team, and the second most successful Formula One team after Ferrari, having won  races, 12 Drivers' Championships and 8 Constructors' Championships. McLaren also has a history of competing in American open wheel racing, as both an entrant and a chassis constructor, and has won the Canadian-American Challenge Cup (Can-Am) sports car racing championship. The team is a subsidiary of the McLaren Group, which owns a majority of the team.

Founded in 1963 by New Zealander Bruce McLaren, the team won its first Grand Prix at the 1968 Belgian Grand Prix, but their greatest initial success was in Can-Am, which they dominated from 1967 to 1971. Further American triumph followed, with Indianapolis 500 wins in McLaren cars for Mark Donohue in 1972 and Johnny Rutherford in 1974 and 1976.

In 1981, McLaren merged with Ron Dennis' Project Four Racing; Dennis took over as team principal, and shortly afterwards organised a buyout of the original McLaren shareholders to take full control of the team. This began the team's most successful era; with Porsche and Honda engines, Niki Lauda, Alain Prost, and Ayrton Senna won seven Drivers' Championships between them and the team took six Constructors' Championships. The combination of Prost and Senna was particularly dominant—together they won all but one race in —but later their rivalry soured and Prost left for Ferrari. By the mid-1990s, Honda had withdrawn from Formula One, Senna had moved to Williams, and the team went three seasons without a win.

Ron Dennis retired as McLaren team principal in 2009, handing over to long-time McLaren employee Martin Whitmarsh. At the end of 2013, after the team's worst season since 2004, Whitmarsh was ousted. McLaren announced in 2013 that they would be using Honda engines from 2015 onwards, replacing Mercedes-Benz. The team raced as McLaren Honda for the first time since 1992 at the 2015 Australian Grand Prix. In September 2017, McLaren announced they had agreed on an engine supply with Renault from 2018 to 2020. McLaren is using Mercedes-Benz engines from the 2021 season until at least 2024.

After initially returning to the Indianapolis 500 in 2017 as a backer of Andretti Autosport to run Fernando Alonso and then in 2019 as an independent entry, McLaren announced in August 2019 that they would run in conjunction with Arrow Schmidt Peterson Motorsports starting in 2020 to run the full IndyCar Series, the combined entry being named Arrow McLaren SP. Initially having no ownership interest in the team, McLaren would purchase 75% of the operation in 2021.

McLaren entered the electric off-road racing series Extreme E in 2022 and joined Formula E in the 2022-23 season.

History

Bruce McLaren Motor Racing was founded in 1963 by New Zealander Bruce McLaren. Bruce was a works driver for the British Formula One team Cooper with whom he had won three Grands Prix and come second in the  World Championship. Wanting to compete in the Australasian Tasman Series, Bruce approached his employers, but when team owner Charles Cooper insisted on using 1.5-litre Formula One-specification engines instead of the 2.5-litre motors permitted by the Tasman rules, Bruce decided to set up his own team to run him and his prospective Formula One teammate Timmy Mayer with custom-built Cooper cars.

Bruce won the 1964 series, but Mayer was killed in practice for the final race at the Longford Circuit in Tasmania. When Bruce McLaren approached Teddy Mayer to help him with the purchase of the Zerex sports car from Roger Penske, Teddy Mayer and Bruce McLaren began discussing a business partnership resulting in Teddy Mayer buying in to Bruce McLaren Motor Racing Limited (BMMR) ultimately becoming its largest shareholder. The team was based in Feltham in 1963–1964, and from 1965 until 1981 in Colnbrook, England. The team also held a British licence. Despite this, Bruce never used the traditional British racing green on his cars. Instead, he used colour schemes that were not based on national principles (e.g. his first F1 car, the McLaren M2B, was painted white with a green stripe, to represent a fictional Yamura team in John Frankenheimer's film Grand Prix).

During this period, Bruce drove for his team in sports car races in the United Kingdom and North America and also entered the 1965 Tasman Series with Phil Hill, but did not win it. He continued to drive in Grands Prix for Cooper, but judging that team's form to be waning, decided to race his own cars in 1966.

Racing history: Formula One

Early days (1966–1967)

Bruce McLaren made the team's Grand Prix debut at the 1966 Monaco race (of the current Formula One teams only Ferrari is older). His race ended after nine laps due to a terminal oil leak. The  car was the M2B designed by Robin Herd, but the programme was hampered by a poor choice of engines: a 3.0-litre version of Ford's Indianapolis 500 engine and a Serenissima V8 were used, the latter scoring the team's first point in Britain, but both were underpowered and unreliable. For  Bruce decided to use a British Racing Motors (BRM) V12 engine, but due to delays with the engine, was forced initially to use a modified Formula Two car called the M4B powered by a 2.1-litre BRM V8, later building a similar but slightly larger car called the M5A for the V12. Neither car brought great success, the best result being a fourth at Monaco.

Ford-Cosworth DFV engines (1968–1982)
For , after driving McLaren's sole entry for the previous two years, Bruce was joined by 1967 champion and fellow New Zealander Denny Hulme, who was already racing for McLaren in Can-Am. That year's new M7A car, Herd's final design for the team, was powered by Cosworth's new and soon to be ubiquitous DFV engine (the DFV would go on to be used by McLaren until 1983) and with it a major upturn in form proceeded. Bruce won the Race of Champions at the Brands Hatch circuit and Hulme won the International Trophy at Silverstone, both non-championship races, before Bruce took the team's first championship win at the Belgian Grand Prix. Hulme also won the Italian and Canadian Grands Prix later in the year, helping the team to second in the Constructors' Championship. That year, McLaren experimented with four-wheel drive in the M9A, but the car had only a single outing driven by Derek Bell at the British Grand Prix; Bruce described driving it as like "trying to write your signature with somebody jogging your elbow".

The year  started with a second-place each for Hulme and Bruce in the first two Grands Prix, but in June, Bruce was killed in a crash at Goodwood while testing the new M8D Can-Am car. After his death, Teddy Mayer took over effective control of the team; Hulme continued with Dan Gurney and Peter Gethin partnering him. Gurney won the first two Can-Am events at Mosport and St. Jovite and placed ninth in the third, but left the team mid-season, and Gethin took over from there. While  began promisingly when Hulme led the opening round in South Africa before retiring with broken suspension, ultimately Hulme, Gethin (who left for BRM mid-season,) and Jackie Oliver again failed to score a win. The 1972 season saw improvements though: Hulme won the team's first Grand Prix for two-and-a-half years in South Africa and he and Peter Revson scored ten other podiums, the team finishing third in the Constructors' Championship. McLaren gave Jody Scheckter his Formula One debut at the final race at Watkins Glen. All McLaren drivers used the Ford-Cosworth engines, except for Andrea de Adamich and Nanni Galli who used engines from Alfa Romeo in 1970.

The McLaren M23, designed by Gordon Coppuck, was the team's new car for the  season. Sharing parts of the design of both McLaren's Formula One M19 and Indianapolis M16 cars (itself inspired by Lotus's 72), it was a mainstay for four years. Hulme won with it in Sweden and Revson took the only Grand Prix wins of his career in Britain and Canada. In , Emerson Fittipaldi, world champion with Lotus two years earlier, joined McLaren. Hulme, in his final Formula One campaign, won the Argentinian season-opener; Fittipaldi, with wins in Brazil, Belgium and Canada, took the Drivers' Championship. It was a close fight for Fittipaldi, who secured the title with a fourth at the season-ending United States Grand Prix, putting him three points ahead of Ferrari's Clay Regazzoni. With Hulme and multiple motorcycle world champion Mike Hailwood, he also sealed McLaren's first Constructors' Championship. The year  was less successful for the team: Fittipaldi was second in the championship behind Niki Lauda. Hulme's replacement Jochen Mass took his sole GP win in Spain.

At the end of 1975, Fittipaldi left to join his brother's Fittipaldi/Copersucar team. With the top drivers already signed to other teams, Mayer turned to James Hunt, a driver on whom biographer Gerald Donaldson reflected as having "a dubious reputation". In , Lauda was again strong in his Ferrari; at midseason, he led the championship with 56 points whilst Hunt had only 26 despite wins in Spain (a race from which he was initially disqualified) and France. At the German Grand Prix, though, Lauda crashed heavily, was nearly killed, and missed the next two races. Hunt capitalised by winning four more Grands Prix giving him a three-point deficit going into the finale in Japan. Here it rained torentially, Lauda retired because of safety concerns, and Hunt sealed the Drivers' Championship by finishing third. McLaren, though, lost the Constructors' Championship to Ferrari.

In , the M23 was gradually replaced with the M26, the M23's final works outing being Gilles Villeneuve's Formula One debut with the team in a one-off appearance at the British Grand Prix. Hunt won on three occasions that year, but the Lauda and Ferrari combination proved too strong, Hunt and McLaren managing just fifth and third in the respective championships. From there, results continued to worsen. Lotus and Mario Andretti took the  titles with their 78 and 79 ground-effect cars and neither Hunt nor Mass's replacement Patrick Tambay were able to seriously challenge with the nonground-effect M26. Hunt was dropped at the end of 1978 in favour of Lotus's Ronnie Peterson, but when Peterson was killed by a crash at the Italian Grand Prix, John Watson was signed, instead. Tambay scored no points and Watson only 15 to place the team eighth at the end of the year.

The 1980s started much as the 1970s had ended: Alain Prost took over from Tambay but Watson and he rarely scored points. Under increasing pressure since the previous year from principal sponsor Philip Morris and their executive John Hogan, Mayer was coerced into merging McLaren with Ron Dennis's Project Four Formula Two team, also sponsored by Philip Morris. Dennis had designer John Barnard who, inspired by the carbon-fibre rear wings of the BMW M1 race cars that Project Four was preparing, had ideas for an innovative Formula One chassis constructed from carbon-fibre instead of conventional aluminium alloy. In the MP4, Watson won the British Grand Prix and had three other podium finishes. Soon after the merger, McLaren moved from Colnbrook to a new base in Woking and Dennis and Mayer initially shared the managing directorship of the company; by 1982, Mayer had departed and Tyler Alexander's and his shareholdings had been bought by the new owners.

TAG-Porsche and Honda engines (1983–1992)
In the early 1980s, teams like Renault, Ferrari and Brabham were using 1.5-litre turbocharged engines in favour of the 3.0-litre naturally aspirated engines that had been standard since 1966. Having seen in 1982 the need for a turbo engine of their own, Dennis had convinced Williams backer Techniques d'Avant Garde (TAG) to fund Porsche-built, TAG-branded turbo engines made to Barnard's specifications; TAG's founder Mansour Ojjeh would later become a McLaren shareholder. In the meantime, they continued with Cosworth engines as old rival Lauda came out of retirement in 1982 to drive alongside Watson in that year's 1B development of the MP4. They each won two races, Watson notably from 17th place on the grid in Detroit, and at one stage of the season McLaren were second in the constructors' championship. As part of a dispute with FISA, they boycotted the San Marino Grand Prix. Although  was not so fruitful, Watson did win again in the United States, this time from 22nd on the grid at Long Beach.

Now using the TAG engines, the team dominated, scoring 12 wins and two-and-a-half times as many constructors' points as nearest rival Ferrari. In the Drivers' Championship, Lauda prevailed over Prost by half a point, the narrowest margin ever. In , the Williams team were resurgent with their Honda engine and drivers Nigel Mansell and Nelson Piquet, while at McLaren, Lauda's replacement, 1982 champion Keke Rosberg could not gel with the car. Williams took the Constructors' Championship, but for Prost, wins in San Marino, Monaco, and Austria combined with the fact that the Williams drivers were taking points from each other meant that he retained a chance going into the last race, the Australian Grand Prix. In  Barnard departed for Ferrari to be replaced by Steve Nichols (who himself joined Ferrari in 1989). In the hands of Prost and Stefan Johansson, though, Nichols's MP4/3 and the TAG engine could not match the Williams-Honda.

For , Honda switched their supply to McLaren and, encouraged by Prost, Dennis signed Ayrton Senna to drive. Despite regulations reducing the boost pressure and fuel capacity (and therefore, power) of the turbo cars, Honda persisted with a turbocharged engine. In the MP4/4, Senna and Prost engaged in a season-long battle, winning 15 of the 16 races (at the other race at Monza, Senna had been leading comfortably, but collided with back-marker Jean-Louis Schlesser). At the Portuguese Grand Prix, their relationship soured when Senna squeezed Prost against the pit wall; Prost won, but afterwards said, "It was dangerous. If he wants the world championship that badly he can have it." Prost scored more points that year, but because only the best 11 results counted, Senna took the title at the penultimate race in Japan.

The next year, with turbos banned, Honda supplied a new 3.5-L naturally aspirated V10 engine and McLaren again won both titles with the MP4/5. Their drivers' relationship continued to deteriorate, though, especially when, at the San Marino Grand Prix, Prost felt that Senna had reneged on an agreement not to pass each other at the first corner. Believing that Honda and Dennis were favouring Senna, Prost announced mid-season that he would leave to drive at Ferrari the following year. For the second year in succession, the Drivers' Championship was decided at the Japanese Grand Prix, this time in Prost's favour after Senna and he collided (Senna initially recovered and won the race, but was later disqualified).

McLaren, in turn, brought in Ferrari's Gerhard Berger, but like the two seasons before, the Drivers' Championship was led by Prost and Senna and settled at the penultimate race in Japan. Here, Senna collided with Prost at the first corner, forcing both to retire, but this time Senna escaped punishment and took the title; McLaren also won the Constructors' Championship. The  year was another for McLaren and Senna, with the ascendant Renault-powered Williams team their closest challengers. By , Williams, with their advanced FW14B car, had overtaken McLaren, breaking their four-year run as champions, despite the latter winning five races that year.

Ford, Lamborghini and Peugeot engines (1993–1994)
As Honda withdrew from the sport at end of 1992 due to the burst of the Japanese asset price bubble, McLaren sought a new engine supplier. A deal to secure Renault engines fell through, subsequently McLaren switched to customer Ford engines for the  season. Senna—who initially agreed only to a race-by-race contract before later signing for the whole year—won five races, including a record-breaking sixth victory at Monaco and a win at the European Grand Prix, where he went from fifth to first on the opening lap. His teammate, 1991 CART champion Michael Andretti, fared much worse; he scored only seven points, and was replaced by test driver Mika Häkkinen for the final three rounds of the season. Williams ultimately won both titles and Senna—who had flirted with moving there for 1993—signed with them for the  season. During the 1993 season McLaren took part in a seven part BBC Television documentary called A Season With McLaren.

McLaren tested a Lamborghini V12 engine ahead of the  season, as part of a potential deal with the then-Lamborghini owner Chrysler, before eventually deciding to use Peugeot engines. With Peugeot power, the MP4/9 was driven by Häkkinen and Martin Brundle, despite achieving eight podiums over the season no wins were achieved. Peugeot was dropped after a single year due to multiple engine failures/unreliability which cost McLaren potential race victories and they switched to a Mercedes-Benz-branded, Ilmor-designed engine.

Mercedes partnership (1995–2014)

1995–2009: Works Mercedes partnership
For 1995 season onwards, McLaren ended their engine deal with Peugeot Sport and started an engine full-works partnership with Mercedes-Benz High Performance Engines for the first time, after the German manufacturer spent one year in partnership with the Sauber team. The partnership included free engines from Mercedes-Benz that built and assembled by Ilmor Engineering, Mercedes-Benz official team vehicles, financial support, also earned full-factory support from Daimler AG and Mercedes-Benz and also Mercedes-Benz and Ilmor staff would work with the team at their Woking base.

McLaren's Formula One car for the  season, the MP4/10, was not a front-runner and Brundle's replacement, former champion Nigel Mansell, was unable to fit into the car at first and departed after just two races, with Mark Blundell taking his place.

In , however, Coulthard broke this run by winning the season-opening Australian Grand Prix; Häkkinen and he would each win another race before the end of the season, and highly rated designer Adrian Newey joined the team from Williams in August that year. Despite the car's improved pace, unreliability proved costly throughout the season, with retirements at the British and Luxembourg Grands Prix occurring whilst Häkkinen was in the lead.

Häkkinen and Coulthard won five of the first six races despite the banning of the team's "brake steer" system, which allowed the rear brakes to be operated individually to reduce understeer, after a protest by Ferrari at the second race in Brazil. Schumacher and Ferrari provided the greatest competition, the former levelled on points with Häkkinen with two races to go, but wins for Häkkinen at the Luxembourg and Japanese Grands Prix gave both him the Drivers' Championship and McLaren the Constructors' Championship. Häkkinen won his second Drivers' Championship the following season, but due to a combination of driver errors and mechanical failures, the team lost the constructors' title to Ferrari.

In  McLaren won seven races in a close fight with Ferrari, but ultimately Ferrari and Schumacher prevailed in both competitions. This marked the start of a decline in form as Ferrari cemented their dominance of Formula One and also beryllium engine material banned in Formula One that affected Mercedes engine performance.

The year  started promisingly, with one win each for Coulthard and Räikkönen at the first two Grands Prix. However, they were hampered when the MP4-18 car designed for that year suffered crash test and reliability problems, forcing them to continue using a 'D' development of the year-old MP4-17 for longer than they had initially planned. Despite this, Räikkönen scored points consistently and challenged for the championship up to the final race, eventually losing by two points. The team began  with the MP4-19, which technical director Adrian Newey described as "a debugged version of [the MP4-18]". It was not a success, though, and was replaced mid-season by the MP4-19B. With this, Räikkönen scored the team's and his only win of the year at the Belgian Grand Prix, as McLaren finished fifth in the Constructors' Championship, their worst ranking since 1983.

However, both the team not being able to work out why the car could not heat its tyres properly in the early stages of the season and the overall unreliability of the MP4-20 cost several race victories when Räikkönen had been leading or in contention to win and also costing him grid positions in some qualifying sessions, which allowed Renault and their driver Fernando Alonso to capitalise and win both titles.

In , the superior reliability and speed of the Ferraris and Renaults prevented the team from gaining any victories for the first time in a decade. Montoya parted company acrimoniously with the team to race in NASCAR after the United States Grand Prix, where he crashed into Räikkönen at the start; test driver Pedro de la Rosa deputised for the remainder of the season. The team also lost Räikkönen to Ferrari at the end of the year.

Steve Matchett argued that the poor reliability of McLaren in 2006 and recent previous years was due to a lack of team continuity and stability. His cited examples of instability are logistical challenges related to the move to the McLaren Technology Centre, Adrian Newey's aborted move to Jaguar and later move to Red Bull, the subsequent move of Newey's deputy to Red Bull, and personnel changes at Ilmor.

That year saw Fernando Alonso race alongside Formula One debutant and long-time McLaren protégé Lewis Hamilton. The pair scored four wins each and led the Drivers' Championship for much of the year, but tensions arose within the team, BBC Sport claimed that Alonso was unable to cope with Hamilton's competitiveness. At the Hungarian Grand Prix, Alonso was judged to have deliberately impeded his teammate during qualifying, so the team were not allowed to score Constructors' points at the event. An internal agreement within the McLaren team stated that drivers would alternatively have an extra lap for qualifying, however, Lewis Hamilton refused to accept for the Hungarian Grand Prix. Subsequently, the McLaren team was investigated by the FIA for having proprietary technical blueprints of Ferrari's car – the so-called "Spygate" controversy. At the first hearing, McLaren management consistently denied all knowledge, blaming a single "rogue engineer". However, in the final hearing, McLaren was found guilty and the team was excluded from the Constructors' Championship and fined $100 million. The drivers were allowed to continue without penalty, and whilst Hamilton led the Drivers' Championship heading into the final race in Brazil, Räikkönen in the Ferrari won the race and the Drivers' Championship, a single point ahead of both McLaren drivers. In November, Alonso and McLaren agreed to terminate their contract by mutual consent, Heikki Kovalainen filling the vacant seat alongside Hamilton.

In , a close fight ensued between Hamilton and the Ferraris of Felipe Massa and Räikkönen; Hamilton won five times and despite also crossing the finish line first at the Belgian Grand Prix, he was deemed to have gained an illegal advantage by cutting a chicane during an overtake and was controversially demoted to third. Going into the final race in Brazil, Hamilton had a seven-point lead over Massa. Massa won there, but Hamilton dramatically clinched his first Drivers' Championship by moving into the necessary fifth position at the final corner of the final lap of the race. Despite winning his first Grand Prix in Hungary, Kovalainen finished the season only seventh in the overall standings, allowing Ferrari to take the constructors' title.

Before the start of the  season, Dennis retired as team principal, handing responsibility to Martin Whitmarsh, but the year started badly: the MP4-24 car was off the pace and the team was given a three-race suspended ban for misleading stewards at the Australian and Malaysian Grands Prix. Despite these early problems, a late revival had Hamilton win at the Hungarian and Singapore Grands Prix.

2010–2014: Customer Mercedes engines
 
For the 2010 season, McLaren lost its status as the Mercedes works team; Mercedes decided to buy the Brackley-based Brawn team that had won the 2009 titles with its customer engines, Whitmarsh having chosen to abandon their exclusive rights to the Mercedes engines to help Brawn run. Mercedes still continued providing engines to McLaren, albeit under a supplier-customer relationship rather than the works partnership as before, while it sold its 40% shares of McLaren over two years. Button won twice (in Australia and China) and Hamilton three times (in Turkey, Canada, and Belgium), but they and McLaren failed to win their respective championships, that year's MP4-25 largely outpaced by Red Bull's RB6.

Hamilton and Button remained with the team into , with Hamilton winning three races – China, Germany, and Abu Dhabi and Button also winning three races – Canada, Hungary, and Japan. Button finished the Drivers' Championship in second place with 270 points behind 2011 Drivers' Champion Sebastian Vettel of Red Bull Racing, ahead of Hamilton's 227 points. McLaren was second in the Constructors' Championship to Red Bull Racing. Throughout the season, Hamilton was involved in several incidents with other drivers including – most notably – multiple collisions with 2008 title rival Massa.

The car also suffered reliability problems which cost the team and its drivers numerous potential points, most notably in Singapore and Abu Dhabi, where Hamilton had been leading from the front in both races  and in Italy where the team lost a 1-2 finish when Button's car failed with fuel problems on lap 33.

The team's car for the season, the MP4-28, was launched on 31 January 2013. The car struggled to compete with the other top teams and the season had McLaren fail to produce a podium finish for the first time since .

McLaren was the first team to officially launch their 2014 car, the MP4-29, which was revealed on 24 January 2014. They had a largely unsuccessful 2014; their best result was in Australia where – after Daniel Ricciardo's disqualification from second place – Magnussen finished second and Button third. Button subsequently finished fourth in Canada, Britain, and Russia. Their highest grid position was in Britain with Button's third place on the grid.

Honda engines (2015–2017)
 
For , McLaren ended their engine deal with Mercedes which included buying back the 40% stake that Mercedes held in the team and reforging their historical partnership with Honda. The Honda deal not only meant they would supply engines, but that Honda staff would work with the team at their Woking base as well as received full-factory support from Honda including official team vehicles and free engines. The team announced Fernando Alonso and Jenson Button as their race drivers, with Kevin Magnussen demoted to test driver. During pre-season testing at the Circuit de Barcelona-Catalunya in February, Alonso suffered a concussion and, as a result, Kevin Magnussen replaced him for the season-opening  in March. At that inaugural race of the season, Jenson Button finished 11th, but was lapped twice and finished last of the finishing cars. Following considerable unreliability and initial suggestions that the Honda engine was underpowered relative to its competitors, steady performance gains eventually resulted in Button managing to score the team's first (four) points of the season at the sixth round in Monaco. By contrast, Alonso scored his first point three races later at the British Grand Prix.
The Hungarian Grand Prix saw the team score their best result of the season with Alonso and Button finishing fifth and ninth, respectively. However, McLaren did not score points in the next four races until Button finished ninth at the Russian Grand Prix. At the following United States Grand Prix, Button scored his best result of the season with sixth place. The team finished ninth in the constructors' standings with 27 points, McLaren's worst performance since 1980.
McLaren retained the Alonso - Button pairing for the  season. The second year of the Honda partnership was better than the first, with the team being able to challenge for top 10 positions on a more regular basis. However, the season started with a massive crash at the Australian Grand Prix in which Fernando Alonso sustained rib fractures and a collapsed lung after colliding with Esteban Gutiérrez and somersaulting into the crash barriers. Alonso, as a result of his injuries, was forced to miss the second round of the Championship, the Bahrain Grand Prix, and was replaced by reserve driver Stoffel Vandoorne. Vandoorne produced an impressive performance in his first race to score the team's first point of the season with 10th place. The next points for McLaren came at the Russian Grand Prix with Alonso and Button finishing sixth and 10th respectively. The rain-affected Monaco Grand Prix was one of best races of the season for the team. Alonso finished fifth, having kept Nico Rosberg's Mercedes behind him for 46 laps, while Button scored two points with ninth. At the Austrian Grand Prix, Button recorded his best result of the season with a sixth-place after qualifying third in a wet/dry session. After a disappointing display at their home race, the British Grand Prix at Silverstone, the team scored points at the next three rounds with six points in Hungary, four in Germany, and six points again thanks to an impressive seventh-place finish from Alonso at the Belgian Grand Prix. At the United States Grand Prix, McLaren matched their Monaco result with 12 points after an attacking race from Alonso saw him claim fifth position while Button once again finished ninth. After a season of significant progress compared to 2015, Alonso and Button finished the championship in 10th and 15th places respectively with the team ending the season in sixth place in the Constructors' Championship with 76 points. On 3 September 2016, Jenson Button announced he would take a sabbatical from Formula One for the 2017 season. He then confirmed on 25 November that he would retire from F1 altogether with Vandoorne being Alonso's new Teammate for 2017.

In February 2017, McLaren signed Lando Norris to their Young Driver Programme.

Alonso did not take part in the 2017 Monaco Grand Prix as he was participating in the Indianapolis 500. Instead Jenson Button returned for the one race as his replacement. McLaren finished 2017 9th with 30 points in total.

Renault engines (2018–2020)

McLaren announced during the 2017 Singapore Grand Prix weekend that they would split from engine supplier Honda at the end of the 2017 season and had agreed on a three-year customer deal to be supplied with Mecachrome-assembled Renault engines. Team boss Éric Boullier described their performance between 2015 and 2017 as a "proper disaster" for the team's credibility.  was the first season in McLaren's history when their cars were powered by Renault engines. McLaren also announced that Fernando Alonso and Stoffel Vandoorne would remain with the team for the 2018 season. On 6 November 2017, the team announced that Lando Norris would be the team's test and reserve driver.

At the season-opening Australian Grand Prix, Fernando Alonso scored the team's best finish since the 2016 Monaco Grand Prix with fifth, Alonso said that the team's target would be Red Bull Racing. McLaren had a relatively good start to the season with points finishes in the next four races, but in the next 16 races after Spain, McLaren only scored 22 points, 8 points less than in the same period in 2017. On 14 August 2018, Fernando Alonso announced he would not compete in Formula One in 2019, ending his four-year spell at the team. Carlos Sainz Jr. was signed as his replacement on a multi-year deal. On 3 September 2018, it was announced that Stoffel Vandoorne would be leaving the team at the end of the season, with Lando Norris being promoted from reserve driver to replace him in 2019. McLaren struggled with performance throughout the season, with the McLaren drivers being knocked out 21 times in the first qualifying session, and McLaren having the second-worst average qualifying ranking of any team, only ahead of Williams. The team finished the disappointing season – after being helped by the exclusion of Force India's points from the first 12 races – in 6th place with 62 points, 357 points behind their target, Red Bull Racing, with the same engine.

The 2019 season was much more positive for McLaren, with the team securely establishing themselves as the best constructor behind Mercedes, Ferrari, and Red Bull. At the Brazilian Grand Prix, Sainz recorded the team's first podium since the 2014 Australian Grand Prix, finishing fourth on the road but later promoted to third after Lewis Hamilton received a post-race penalty, meaning that the team missed out on the official podium ceremony. McLaren ended the season in 4th place with 145 points, their best result since 2014 and 54 points ahead of their nearest competitor, Renault.

McLaren retained Norris and Sainz for the  season. The season was significantly impacted by the COVID-19 pandemic. The season was shortened to 18 races, with the season opener to take place in Austria. At the Austrian Grand Prix, Norris achieved his first ever podium, finishing in third. Sainz achieved the teams second podium in 2020 at the Italian Grand Prix, where he finished second. The team finished the 2020 season third in the constructors' championship with 202 points. Sainz finished the driver's championship sixth with 105 points and Norris ninth with 97 points.

Return to Mercedes engines (2021–)

McLaren again used Mercedes engines in  after their deal with Renault ended. McLaren had previously collaborated with Mercedes from 1995 through 2014 (1995 to 2009 was a works partner and later 2010 to 2014 was a customer partner) but this time a customer role system. Daniel Ricciardo moved from Renault to partner Lando Norris for the 2021 Formula One World Championship on a multi-year deal. Ricciardo replaced Carlos Sainz, who moved to Ferrari. In the season's first nine races, the team scored three podiums with Mercedes power, in Italy, Monaco and Austria, all courtesy of Norris.

At the 2021 Italian Grand Prix, Ricciardo scored his first win since the 2018 Monaco Grand Prix, and McLaren's first win since the 2012 Brazilian Grand Prix. A second-place finish for Norris also meant that McLaren achieved their first one-two finish since the 2010 Canadian Grand Prix and the only one-two finish for the 2021 season. Norris secured the team's first pole position in the hybrid era at the 2021 Russian Grand Prix but was unable to convert it to a win, finishing in 7th place due to the sudden drastic change in weather conditions and team strategy in the last two laps of the race. A subsequent drop in form in the latter part of the season saw McLaren ending up fourth in the constructors' championship behind Ferrari.

For the  season, McLaren retained both Norris and Ricciardo. Ricciardo tested positive for COVID-19 ahead of the pre-season tests in Bahrain, which meant Norris was required to do all the remaining running for the test, though a brake problem limited the testing he was able to conduct. Both drivers struggled at the first race in Bahrain, with neither driving reaching Q3 – the first time since the 2020 Turkish Grand Prix – and finishing 14th and 15th in the race. Norris achieved third at the Emilia Romagna Grand Prix. After Norris missed the first day at the track during the São Paulo Grand Prix weekend, McLaren suffered their first double DNF finish since Monaco 2017, as Norris had an electrical fault and Ricciardo was involved in a collision with the Haas of Kevin Magnussen. Compared to his teammate, Ricciardo struggled and many were critical of his performance, with some suggesting that McLaren would drop him. This forced Ricciardo into releasing a statement on Instagram, confirming he would stay through to 2023. In August 2022, Riccardo's contract for 2023 was terminated by mutual agreement. Oscar Piastri is due to replace Ricciardo, after a contract dispute with Alpine F1 Team was resolved in McLaren's favour by the FIA Contract Recognition Board. McLaren finished the season in fifth place in the constructors' championship behind Alpine.

Racing history: Other series

Can-Am

McLaren's first racing car designed and built "from the rubber up" by Bruce McLaren Motor Racing was the M1. The car with a small block Oldsmobile had immediate success driven by Bruce McLaren. The car was raced in North America and Europe in 1964 in various A sports and United States Road Racing Championship events.In 1965 the team car was the M1A prototype from which the production Elva M1A’s were based. In late 1965, the M1B (also known as Mk2) was the team car for the North American races at the end of the year. For the Can-Am Series, which started in 1966, McLaren created the M3 which Bruce and Chris Amon drove – customer cars also appeared in several races in the 1966 season. With the M3, they led two races but scored no wins, and the inaugural title was taken by John Surtees in a Lola T70. The following year, Robin Herd purpose-designed the Chevrolet V8-powered M6A, delays with the Formula One programme allowing the team to spend extra resources on developing the Can-Am car which was the first to be painted in McLaren orange. With Denny Hulme now partnering Bruce, they won five of six races and Bruce won the championship, setting the pattern for the next four years. In the 1968 season, they used a new car, the M8, to win four races; non-works McLarens took the other two, but this time Hulme was victorious overall. In the 1969 season, McLaren domination became total as they won all 11 races with the M8B; Hulme won five, and Bruce won six and the Drivers' Championship. From 1969 onwards, McLaren M12 – the customer "variant" of the M8 – was driven by several entrants, including a version modified by Jim Hall of Chaparral fame. McLaren's success in Can-Am brought with it financial rewards, both prize money and money from selling cars to other teams, that helped to support the team and fund the nascent and relatively poor-paying Formula One programme.

When Bruce was killed testing the 1970 season's M8D, he was at first replaced by Dan Gurney, then later by Peter Gethin. They won two and one races, respectively, while Hulme won six on the way to the championship. Private teams competing in the 1970 Can-Am series included older M3Bs as well as the M12 – the customer version of the team's M8B. In the 1971 season, the team held off the challenge of 1969 world champion Jackie Stewart in the Lola T260, winning eight races, with Peter Revson taking the title. Hulme also won three Can-Am races in the 1972 season, but the McLaren M20 was defeated by the Porsche 917/10s of Mark Donohue and George Follmer. Faced by the greater resources of Porsche, McLaren decided to abandon Can-Am at the end of 1972 and focus solely on open-wheel racing. When the original Can-Am series ceased at the end of the 1974 season, McLaren was by far the most successful constructor with 43 wins.

Indianapolis 500

McLaren first contested the United States Auto Club's (USAC) Indianapolis 500 race in 1970, encouraged by their tyre supplier Goodyear, which wanted to break competitor Firestone's stranglehold on the event. With the M15 car, Bruce, Chris Amon, and Denny Hulme entered, but after Amon withdrew and Hulme was severely burned on the hands in an incident in practice, Peter Revson and Carl Williams took their places in the race to retire and finish seventh, respectively. The team also contested some of the more prestigious races in the USAC championship that year, as they would do in subsequent years. For 1971 they had a new car, the M16, which driver Mark Donohue said: "...obsoleted every other car on track..." At that year's Indianapolis 500, Revson qualified on pole and finished second, whilst in 1972, Donohue won in privateer Team Penske's M16B. The 1973 event had Johnny Rutherford join the team; he qualified on pole, but finished ninth, Revson crashed out. McLaren won their first Indianapolis 500 in 1974 with Rutherford. The McLaren and Rutherford combination was second in 1975 and won again in 1976. Developments of the M16 had been used throughout this period until the new M24 car was introduced in 1977. The team did not reproduce their recent success at Indianapolis in 1977, 1978, or 1979, and although they continued to win other USAC races, by the end of 1979, they decided to end their involvement.

On 12 April 2017, McLaren revealed they would participate in the 2017 Indianapolis 500 with their current Formula 1 driver Fernando Alonso at the wheel of a Honda-powered McLaren-branded Andretti Autosport IndyCar.
In qualifying, Alonso secured a second-row start from fifth. During the race Alonso led 27 laps in his first Indy 500 start. With 21 laps remaining Alonso was running seventh when his Honda engine failed. He was classified 24th. After his retirement he received a standing ovation from the grandstands. Alonso was praised for his strong debut.

On 10 November 2018, McLaren announced that they would participate in the 2019 Indianapolis 500 with Fernando Alonso and using Chevrolet engines. However, after mechanical difficulties and a severe crash in practice, the team failed to qualify for the race (as did two other Carlin-associated entries, one with another former F1 driver (Max Chilton) driving).

IndyCar

In August 2019, it was announced McLaren would contest the championship full-time in 2020, collaborating with Arrow Schmidt Peterson Motorsports to form Arrow McLaren SP.

Zak Brown stated in an interview with Leigh Diffey that McLaren joining the IndyCar Series full time was spurred by two different objectives. The first was to market the McLaren brand and some of the McLaren Formula One team's prominent American based sponsors in a primarily North America centric racing series, as Formula One only had three races in North America in 2021 and only one of those races was in the United States. The second was to branch McLaren's engineering expertise into a racing series that the other Formula One teams were not involved in, as Brown thought McLaren would stand out more amongst its competitors in IndyCar than it would in other racing series. Brown also stated that McLaren chose to partner with Schmidt Peterson Motorsports because their previous efforts fielding their team with assistance from Andretti Autosport and Carlin exclusively for the Indianapolis 500 had not been successful and that the purchase of the IndyCar Series by Penske Entertainment gave McLaren more confidence in the long term viability and stability of the series compared to the previous ownership under Tony George.

In August 2021, it was announced that McLaren Racing will acquire a majority stake in the IndyCar Team. The transaction closed by the end of the year and saw McLaren Racing take a 75% share of the team. Financial terms of the deal were not disclosed.

Electric racing 
NEOM is McLaren's title partner into their endeavour to electric motorsport as NEOM McLaren Electric Racing.

Formula E 

In December 2020, Zak Brown announced McLaren's interest in entering Formula E once the company's battery supplier contract has expired. In January the following year, McLaren signed an option to enter the championship for 2022.

McLaren announced the acquisition of Mercedes-EQ Formula E Team in May 2022 and debuted in the 2022-23 season as NEOM McLaren Formula E Team using Nissan's EV powertrain. René Rast, who last raced in the 2020-21 season with Audi Sport ABT Schaeffler, and Jake Hughes were signed as drivers for the team. McLaren made its ePrix debut at the 2023 Mexico City ePrix. Hughes qualified in third and finished the race in fifth place whereas Rast qualified in fifteenth but retired from the race on lap 40 after colliding with Mahindra’s Oliver Rowland. McLaren achieved several milestones at the Diriyah ePrix. In the first round, Hughes qualified at second place (missing out on pole position by 0.060s) but finished in eighth whereas Rast qualified and finished in fifth place while scoring McLaren's first fastest lap in Formula E. In the second round, Hughes secured McLaren's maiden pole position in Formula E and Rast qualified in third place. Hughes finished the race in fifth and Rast finished in third place, giving McLaren their maiden podium finish in Formula E.

Extreme E 

In June 2021, McLaren announced it would enter Extreme E in the 2022 season using existing personnel from outside the Formula One program with Tanner Foust and Emma Gilmour (becoming the first woman factory driver for McLaren) as drivers for the team. Entering as McLaren XE, the team was rebranded for their second race and is known as NEOM McLaren Extreme E for sponsorship reasons. The team won its first podium by finishing second in the Energy X-Prix. In the process, Gilmour became the first woman podium winner for McLaren. The team finished in fifth place in the Team's Championship standings.

Other series
McLaren is reviewing the LMDh regulations for a possible entry into the FIA World Endurance Championship.

Customer racing

Besides the cars raced by the works team, a variety of McLaren racing cars have also been used by customer teams. In their formative years, McLaren built Formula Two, hillclimbing, Formula 5000 and sports racing cars that were sold to customers. Lacking the capacity to build the desired numbers, Trojan was subcontracted to construct some of them. In Can-Am, Trojan built customer versions of the M6 and M8 cars and ex-works cars were sold to privateers when new models arrived; half of the field was McLarens at some races. Author Mark Hughes says, "over 220" McLarens were built by Trojan. In USAC competition and Formula One, too, many teams used McLarens during the late 1960s and 1970s. A 1972 M8F was rebuilt as the C8 for use in Group C racing in 1982, but had little success.

In the mid-1990s, McLaren Racing's sister company, McLaren Cars (now McLaren Automotive) built a racing version of their F1 road car, the F1 GTR which won the 1995 24 Hours of Le Mans and the 1995 and 1996 BPR Global GT Series. In 2011, a GT3 version of the MP4-12C road car was developed in partnership with CRS Racing, making its competetive debut at the VLN and ADAC GT Masters in 2012. The MP4-12C was succeeded by the McLaren 650S and then the McLaren 720S for GT3 racing, while a GT4 version of the McLaren 570S was also developed as well.

In 2022, McLaren Automotive announced a new GT4 model based on the McLaren Artura, along with an unrestricted version named the Artura Trophy, which is to be used in McLaren's planned one-make series.

Characteristics
McLaren Racing is a wholly owned subsidiary of the McLaren Group, which currently includes another subsidiary McLaren Automotive, with the group having centralised many branches of the company since 2010. As of 2021, the group has over 4000 employees, having had only around 1300 in 2009.

Ownership and management

After Bruce McLaren died in a testing accident in 1970, Teddy Mayer took over the team. In 1981, McLaren merged with Ron Dennis' Project Four Racing; Dennis took over as team principal and shortly after organised a buyout of the original McLaren shareholders to take full control of the team. Dennis offered Mansour Ojjeh the chance to purchase 50% of the team in 1983, with McLaren becoming a joint venture with Ojjeh's TAG Group. In 2000, after supplying engines to the team through its Mercedes subsidiary for 5 years, DaimlerChrysler (now Daimler AG) exercised an option to buy 40% of the TAG McLaren Group. Dennis and Ojjeh each retained a 30% share, and each sold half of their stake to the Mumtalakat Holding Company (the sovereign wealth fund of the Kingdom of Bahrain) in 2007. Although Daimler were reportedly considering acquiring the remaining 60% from Dennis and Ojjeh, they instead bought Brawn GP (renaming it Mercedes GP) in November 2009; their McLaren shares were sold back to Mumtalakat, Dennis, and Ojjeh in 2010.

Dennis stepped down as both CEO and team principal of McLaren in 2009, handing both roles over to Martin Whitmarsh. However, following the uncompetitive 2013 season, Dennis retook the role in January 2014; Whitmarsh formally left the team later that year. Dennis sought to take a controlling interest in the company, but his relationship with Ojjeh had deteriorated, perhaps as early as 2013. In 2016, Dennis was forced out of his role as CEO by Ojjeh;. he sold his remaining shares in the company the next year. , Mumtalakat owns 56.3% of McLaren Group, TAG Automotive Ltd. owned 14.3%, Michael Latifi's Nidala (BVI) Ltd. owned 10%, and minor shareholders held the rest.

After Dennis' 2014 return, he had abolished the position of team principal at McLaren, saying it was an 'outdated' position. Éric Boullier was instead named racing director in January 2014, becoming responsible for the F1 team. After Dennis' exit, Zak Brown was chosen for the post of executive director, with the post of CEO being left vacant. The increasing awareness of the mediocrity of the car prompted a reshuffle in 2018: Brown was promoted to CEO in April, and when Boullier resigned in July, his position was divided between Gil de Ferran as sporting director and Andrea Stella as performance director. In May 2019, Andreas Seidl was appointed as a new team principal. In December 2022, Seidl left McLaren to join Sauber as CEO with Stella promoted to team principal.

Since 2004 the team has been based at the McLaren Technology Centre in Woking, England. Facilities there include a wind tunnel and a driving simulator which is said to be the most sophisticated in the sport. The team has also created the McLaren Young Driver Programme, which currently has one driver signed to it.

Politics
McLaren has had an uneasy relationship with Formula One's governing body, the FIA, and its predecessor FISA, as well as with the commercial rights holders of the sport. McLaren was involved, along with the other teams of the Formula One Constructors Association (FOCA), in a dispute with FISA and Alfa Romeo, Renault, and Ferrari over control of the sport in the early 1980s. During this dispute, known as the FISA-FOCA war, a breakaway series was threatened, FISA refused to sanction one race, and FOCA boycotted another. It was eventually resolved by a revenue-sharing deal called the Concorde Agreement.

Subsequent Concorde Agreements were signed in 1987 and 1992, but in 1996, McLaren was again one of the teams which disputed the terms of a new agreement, this time with former FOCA president Bernie Ecclestone's Formula One Promotions and Administration organisation; a new 10-year agreement was eventually signed in 1998. Similar arguments restarted in the mid-2000s, with McLaren and their part-owner Mercedes again threatening to start a rival series, before another Concorde Agreement was signed in 2009. In 2007, McLaren were involved in an espionage controversy after their chief designer Mike Coughlan obtained confidential technical information from Ferrari. McLaren was excluded from the Constructors' Championship for one year, and the team was fined US$100 million. Although the terms of the most recent agreements, in 2013 and 2021, have been extensively negotiated on, McLaren have not taken as openly hostile a stance as in the past.

Sponsorship, naming, and livery

McLaren's Formula One team was originally called Bruce McLaren Motor Racing, and for their first season ran white-and-green coloured cars, which came about as a result of a deal with the makers of the film Grand Prix.

As a result, the livery was changed to a predominantly white one to reflect the sponsor's colours.

In , Philip Morris moved its Marlboro sponsorship to Ferrari and was replaced by Reemtsma's West cigarette branding, with the team entering under the name West McLaren Mercedes. As a result, McLaren adopted a silver and black livery. By mid-2005, a European Union directive banned tobacco advertising in sport, which forced McLaren to end its association with West. In , the team competed without a title sponsor, entering under the name Team McLaren Mercedes. McLaren altered their livery to introduce red into the design, and changed the silver to chrome.

In , McLaren signed a seven-year contract with telecommunications company Vodafone, and became known as Vodafone McLaren Mercedes. The arrangement was due to last until , although the team announced at the 2013 Australian Grand Prix that their partnership would conclude at the end of the  season. Despite explaining the decision to conclude the sponsorship as being a result of Vodafone's desire to reconsider its commercial opportunities, it was later reported that the decision to run the 2012 Bahrain Grand Prix despite an ongoing civil uprising and protests against the race, and Vodafone's inability to remove their logos from the McLaren cars during the race as being a key factor in the decision to terminate the sponsorship. Diageo-owned whisky brand Johnnie Walker, an associate sponsor since 2005, offered to take over as title sponsor at the end of 2013, but their offer of £43m was turned down by McLaren chairman Ron Dennis, who believed it to be "too small."

At the end of 2015, it was announced that McLaren was due to lose sponsor TAG Heuer to Red Bull Racing. McLaren chief Ron Dennis later admitted to falling out with TAG Heuer CEO Jean-Claude Biver. In 2015 McLaren was without a title sponsor, and set to lose a further £20m in sponsorship in 2016. Between 2015 and 2017 the team competed as McLaren Honda due to their partnership with that engine manufacturer. The team has competed as McLaren F1 Team since 2018.

McLaren's cars were originally named with the letter M followed by a number, sometimes also followed by a letter denoting the model. After the 1981 merger with Project Four, the cars were called "MP4/x", or since 2001 "MP4-x", where x is the generation of the chassis (e.g. MP4/1, MP4-22). "MP4" stood initially for "Marlboro Project 4", so that the full title of the cars (McLaren MP4/x) reflected not only the historical name of the team, but also the names of the team's major sponsor and its new component part. Since the change of title sponsor in 1997, "MP4" was said to stand for "McLaren Project 4". From 2017, following Ron Dennis' departure from the team, the naming scheme of the cars changed to "MCL" followed by a number. Since 2017, McLaren have increasingly adopted orange colours, designed to recall Bruce McLaren's liveries.

In , British American Tobacco (BAT) agreed a global partnership with McLaren under its A Better Tomorrow campaign to promote BAT's alternative smoking products Vuse (previously Vype) and Velo (previously Lyft). The agreement has enticed a similar controversy to the Mission Winnow sponsorship with Scuderia Ferrari due to the association with tobacco companies. In July 2020, McLaren announced a multi-year strategic partnership with long time sponsor Gulf Oil International, which includes Gulf being the preferred lubricant supplier to McLaren Automotive and a special Gulf livery for the 2021 Monaco Grand Prix.

Racing results

Formula One results

 Constructors' Championships winning percentage: 
 Drivers' Championships winning percentage: 
 Winning percentage:

Drivers' champions
Seven drivers have won a total of twelve Drivers' Championships with McLaren:
  Emerson Fittipaldi
  James Hunt
  Niki Lauda
  Alain Prost
  Ayrton Senna
  Mika Häkkinen
  Lewis Hamilton

American open-wheel racing results
(key)

  In conjunction with Andretti Autosport.
  In conjunction with Arrow Schmidt Peterson Motorsports.

Race wins

Extreme E results

Racing overview

Racing summary

Complete Extreme E results 
(Races in bold indicate best qualifiers; races in italics indicate fastest super sector)

Formula E results 

Notes
 * – Season still in progress.

References

Footnotes

Citations

Bibliography

 
 
 
 
 
 
 All Formula One World Championship results are taken from Formula1.com. Formula One Administration.

External links

 

British auto racing teams
British racecar constructors
McLaren Group
Companies based in Surrey
British companies established in 1963
1963 establishments in England
Can-Am entrants
Champ Car teams
IndyCar Series teams
Formula One entrants
Formula Two entrants
Formula One World Constructors' Champions
Formula E teams